Reality Check is the seventh studio album by American rapper Juvenile. The album was released on March 7, 2006, by UTP Records and Atlantic Records. The album features guest appearances from Paul Wall, Mike Jones, Fat Joe and Ludacris, among others.

Reality Check was supported by three singles "Rodeo", "Get Ya Hustle On" and "Way I Be Leanin'". The album debuted at number one on the US Billboard 200 chart, selling 174,000 copies its first week. The album was certified gold by the Recording Industry Association of America (RIAA).

Singles
The album's lead single "Rodeo"; it was produced by Cool & Dre was released. The single had charted on the US Billboard Hot 100 chart, peaking at a modest number 41.

The album's second single "Get Ya Hustle On"; it was produced by Donald XL Robertson was released. The song describes as a scathing indictment for the local government and the media's response from the 2005's Hurricane Katrina, including lyrics such as "The mayor ain't your friend, he's the enemy––just to get your vote, a saint is what he pretend to be" and "Fuck Fox News I don't listen to y'all ass, couldn't get a nigga off the roof when the storm passed."

The album's third single "Way I Be Leanin'" featuring Mike Jones, Paul Wall; along with his label-mates Wacko and Skip was released. The music video for "Way I Be Leanin'" premiered on MTV's Making the Video.

Track listing

Charts

Weekly charts

Year-end charts

Certifications

References

2006 albums
Juvenile (rapper) albums
Atlantic Records albums
Albums produced by Scott Storch
Albums produced by Lil Jon
Albums produced by Happy Perez
Albums produced by Cool & Dre
Albums produced by Mannie Fresh
Albums produced by Mike Dean (record producer)
Albums produced by Brian McKnight